The South Broad Street Historic District in Monroe, Georgia is a  historic district which was listed on the National Register of Historic Places in 1983.  The listing included 14 contributing buildings.

The largest properties are the Walker-FieIds House and the Wright-Henson House;  the oldest is the John Felker House, which has elements of both Plantation Plain and American Gothic architecture.

References

Historic districts on the National Register of Historic Places in Georgia (U.S. state)
National Register of Historic Places in Walton County, Georgia
Victorian architecture in Georgia (U.S. state)
Neoclassical architecture in Georgia (U.S. state)